Clarkeite is a uranium oxide mineral with the chemical formula or .

Its color varies from dark brown to reddish orange. Clarkeite forms by oxidation and replacement of uraninite late during pegmatite crystallization. Although uraninite-bearing granite pegmatites are common, clarkeite is rare and occurs intimately intergrown with other uranium minerals.

It is known from only two localities; the Spruce Pine pegmatite district in western North Carolina, US, and Rajputana, in the Ajmer district, India. Clarkeite is the only known naturally occurring high-temperature uranate.

It was named for Frank Wigglesworth Clarke (1847–1931), American mineral chemist, and former chief chemist of the United States Geological Survey.

See also
 List of minerals
 List of minerals named after people
 Sodium uranate

References

Clarkeite: New chemical and structural data
Clarkeite: Clarkeite mineral information and data
WebMineral

Uranium minerals
Sodium minerals
Hydroxide minerals
Trigonal minerals
Minerals in space group 166